Melville Corporation, formerly based in Rye, New York, was a large retail holding company incorporated by Ward Melville in 1922 from Melville Shoe Company. It became CVS Corporation in 1996 under a massive reorganization plan.  The company traded on the New York Stock Exchange (NYSE) under the ticker MES, before changing its ticker to CVS.

During the period from 1925 to 1928, the number of Melville stores increased by 184% and net income expanded 360%. In the first three months of 1929 the chain store realized a 34% increase in sales over 1928. In February 1930 the Melville Shoe Corporation controlled 460 Thom McAn, Rival, and John Ward stores in thirty-nine of the United States. At its peak, Melville operated over 7,282 retail stores in approximately 3,500 unique locations, providing a wide range of products.

In April 1976, the Melville Corporation acquired Marshalls, a chain of thirty-two specialty stores, based in New England. The purchase price was $40 million.

Melville was one of the first companies in the world to develop a shared-services satellite communications network, consolidating the infrastructure of all of its discrete divisions, resulting in significant cost savings for the corporation.

Beginning in the early 1990s, Melville was under pressure to reorganize and shed its diverse portfolio.  Many of the chains the company operated were underperforming.

The chain shed all of its retail chains, except for CVS, which accounted for 40% of Melville's revenue.  Its Peoples, Revco, Standard Drug, and Austin Drug pharmacies were converted to the CVS identity.  Most of the company's units that were unrelated to its pharmacy business were shed in 1996.

Many of the retail divisions that Melville once owned still operate either as independent companies or as subsidiaries of other companies.

Divisions
During the height of Melville's success, the company operated the following retailing divisions.

Pharmacies
CVS Pharmacy
Peoples Drug
Standard Drug
Austin Drug
Freddy's Drug

Apparel
Marshalls (sold to T.J. Maxx in 1995)
Wilsons The Leather Experts
Bermans
Pelle Cuir
Tannery West 
Snyder Leather Outlets
Georgetown Leather Design
Bob's Stores
Accessory Lady
Chess King (sold to Merry-Go-Round in 1993; defunct as of 1995)
Chess King Garage
Foxmoor (sold in 1985; purchased by Edison Brothers Stores in 1990; closed in Edison Brothers liquidation in 1999)
Free Fall
Putnam Stores

Footwear
FootAction USA (spun off as Footstar Inc., now owned by Foot Locker)
FootAction For Kids
Fan Club
Thom McAn (was part of Footstar spinoff, now owned by Sears)
B.O.Q.
Miles 
Open Country
Smart Step
Vanguard
Meldisco
Woodbridge Shoes

Toys
KB Toys (sold to Consolidated Stores in 1996, defunct as of 2010, reviving in 2018)
Circus World
K & K Toys
Toy Works (defunct)
Play Things

Domestics
Linens 'n Things (liquidated in 2008; revived as online retail in 2009)
Prints Plus

Furniture
This End Up
Wood's End
Prism

References

External links
 Ward Melville Heritage Organization
 Harvard Business School Profile of Ward Meville

Retail companies established in 1922
Holding companies established in 1922
Defunct retail companies of the United States
Companies based in Westchester County, New York
Retail companies disestablished in 1996
Defunct companies based in New York (state)
1922 establishments in New York (state)
1996 disestablishments in New York (state)
CVS Health
Holding companies disestablished in 1996
American companies established in 1922
American companies disestablished in 1996